In mathematics, the inverse hyperbolic functions are the inverse functions of the hyperbolic functions.

For a given value of a hyperbolic function, the corresponding inverse hyperbolic function provides the corresponding hyperbolic angle. The size of the hyperbolic angle is equal to the area of the corresponding hyperbolic sector of the hyperbola , or twice the area of the corresponding sector of the unit hyperbola , just as a circular angle is twice the area of the circular sector of the unit circle. Some authors have called inverse hyperbolic functions "area functions" to realize the hyperbolic angles.

Hyperbolic functions occur in the calculations of angles and distances in hyperbolic geometry. It also occurs in the solutions of many linear differential equations (such as the equation defining a catenary), cubic equations, and Laplace's equation in Cartesian coordinates. Laplace's equations are important in many areas of physics, including electromagnetic theory, heat transfer, fluid dynamics, and special relativity.

Notation
The ISO 80000-2 standard abbreviations consist of ar- followed by the abbreviation of the corresponding hyperbolic function (e.g., arsinh, arcosh).
The prefix arc- followed by the corresponding hyperbolic function (e.g., arcsinh, arccosh) is also commonly seen, by analogy with the nomenclature for inverse trigonometric functions. These are misnomers, since the prefix arc is the abbreviation for arcus, while the prefix ar stands for area; the hyperbolic functions are not directly related to arcs.

Other authors prefer to use the notation argsinh, argcosh, argtanh, and so on, where the prefix arg is the abbreviation of the Latin argumentum. In computer science, this is often shortened to asinh.

Definitions in terms of logarithms

For complex arguments, the inverse hyperbolic functions, the square root and the logarithm are multi-valued functions, and the equalities of the next subsections may be viewed as equalities of multi-valued functions.

For all inverse hyperbolic functions (save the inverse hyperbolic cotangent and the inverse hyperbolic cosecant), the domain of the real function is connected.

Inverse hyperbolic sine
Inverse hyperbolic sine (a.k.a. area hyperbolic sine) (Latin: Area sinus hyperbolicus):

The domain is the real numbers.

Inverse hyperbolic cosine
Inverse hyperbolic cosine (a.k.a. area hyperbolic cosine) (Latin: Area cosinus hyperbolicus):

The domain is the closed interval .

Inverse hyperbolic tangent
Inverse hyperbolic tangent (a.k.a. area hyperbolic tangent) (Latin: Area tangens hyperbolicus):

The domain is the open interval  .

Inverse hyperbolic cotangent 
Inverse hyperbolic cotangent (a.k.a., area hyperbolic cotangent) (Latin: Area cotangens hyperbolicus):

Inverse hyperbolic secant
Inverse hyperbolic secant (a.k.a., area hyperbolic secant) (Latin: Area secans hyperbolicus):

The domain is the semi-open interval .

Inverse hyperbolic cosecant 
Inverse hyperbolic cosecant (a.k.a., area hyperbolic cosecant) (Latin: Area cosecans hyperbolicus):

The domain is all the real numbers except 0.

Addition formulae

Other identities

Composition of hyperbolic and inverse hyperbolic functions

Composition of inverse hyperbolic and trigonometric functions

Conversions

Derivatives

For an example differentiation: let θ = arsinh x, so (where sinh2 θ = (sinh θ)2):

Series expansions

Expansion series can be obtained for the above functions:

An asymptotic expansion for arsinh is given by

Principal values in the complex plane

As functions of a complex variable, inverse hyperbolic functions are multivalued functions that are analytic, except at a finite number of points. For such a function, it is common to define a principal value, which is a single valued analytic function which coincides with one specific branch of the multivalued function, over a domain consisting of the complex plane in which a finite number of arcs (usually half lines or line segments) have been removed. These arcs are called branch cuts. For specifying the branch, that is, defining which value of the multivalued function is considered at each point, one generally define it at a particular point, and deduce the value everywhere in the domain of definition of the principal value by analytic continuation. When possible, it is better to define the principal value directly—without referring to analytic continuation.

For example, for the square root, the principal value is defined as the square root that has a positive real part. This defines a single valued analytic function, which is defined everywhere, except for non-positive real values of the variables (where the two square roots have a zero real part). This principal value of the square root function is denoted  in what follows. Similarly, the principal value of the logarithm, denoted  in what follows, is defined as the value for which the imaginary part has the smallest absolute value. It is defined everywhere except for non-positive real values of the variable, for which two different values of the logarithm reach the minimum.

For all inverse hyperbolic functions, the principal value may be defined in terms of principal values of the square root and the logarithm function. However, in some cases, the formulas of  do not give a correct principal value, as giving a domain of definition which is too small and, in one case non-connected.

Principal value of the inverse hyperbolic sine

The principal value of the inverse hyperbolic sine is given by 

If the argument of the logarithm is real, then it is positive.

Principal value of the inverse hyperbolic cosine 
Thus the square root has to be factorized, leading to

The principal values of the square roots are both defined, except if  belongs to the real interval . If the argument of the logarithm is real, then  is real and has the same sign. Thus, the above formula defines a principal value of arcosh outside the real interval , which is thus the unique branch cut.

Principal values of the inverse hyperbolic tangent and cotangent

The formulas given in  suggests  

for the definition of the principal values of the inverse hyperbolic tangent and cotangent. In these formulas, the argument of the logarithm is real if and only if  is real.

Principal value of the inverse hyperbolic cosecant

For the inverse hyperbolic cosecant, the principal value is defined as
.

It is defined when the arguments of the logarithm and the square root are not non-positive real numbers. The principal value of the square root is thus defined outside the interval  of the imaginary line. If the argument of the logarithm is real, then  is a non-zero real number, and this implies that the argument of the logarithm is positive.

Thus, the principal value is defined by the above formula outside the branch cut, consisting of the interval  of the imaginary line.

For , there is a singular point that is included in the branch cut.

Principal value of the inverse hyperbolic secant

Here, as in the case of the inverse hyperbolic cosine, we have to factorize the square root. This gives the principal value

If the argument of the logarithm is real and negative, then  is also real and negative.

For , there is a singular point that is included in one of the branch cuts.

Graphical representation

In the following graphical representation of the principal values of the inverse hyperbolic functions, the branch cuts appear as discontinuities of the color. The fact that the whole branch cuts appear as discontinuities, shows that these principal values may not be extended into analytic functions defined over larger domains. In other words, the above defined branch cuts are minimal.

See also
Complex logarithm
Hyperbolic secant distribution
ISO 80000-2
List of integrals of inverse hyperbolic functions

References

Bibliography 
 Herbert Busemann and Paul J. Kelly (1953) Projective Geometry and Projective Metrics, page 207, Academic Press.

External links